The 2020 Vietnamese National Football Second League is the 22nd season of the Vietnamese National Football Second League. The season began on 10 July.

Teams
15 sides compete in the 2020 season, split into two groups, A and B, of 7 and 8 respectively.

Group A

Group B

Personnel and kits

League tables

Group A

Group B

Ranking of last-placed teams 
Due to the difference of teams between the 2 groups, results of the matches between the last-placed team in group B and the group B winners will not be counted.

<onlyinclude>

<onlyinclude>

Final stage

Semi-finals 
Winners are awarded as co-champions and promoted to the 2021 V.League 2. Losers enter the promotion final match.

Promotion final 
Winners are awarded as third-placers and promoted to the 2021 V.League 2.

See also
 2020 V.League 1
 2020 V.League 2
 2020 Vietnamese National Football Third League

References

2020 in Vietnamese football